"Glorious" is the only single taken from Glorious: The Singles 97–07, the greatest hits compilation by Natalie Imbruglia. The music video for "Glorious" was directed by Frank Borin (Red Hot Chili Peppers, Eminem, Good Charlotte), and roaded in California. The video is inspired by the movie Y Tu Mamá También, in which Imbruglia collaborated before in the soundtrack, with the song "Cold Air", and follows Natalie and friends on a roadtrip through Mexico. "But instead of filming it in Mexico, I ended up in the California desert in 45C," she said.

Track listing
"Glorious" (Crispin Hunt, Natalie Imbruglia) – 3:25
"That Girl" (Natalie Imbruglia, Martin Terefe, John Kennedy) – 3:26

Glorious EP
"Glorious" (Crispin Hunt, Natalie Imbruglia) – 3:25
"That Girl" (Natalie Imbruglia, Martin Terefe, John Kennedy) – 3:26
"Identify" (Billy Corgan, Mike Garson, Nigel Godrich) – 4:08
"Glorious (Live)" (Crispin Hunt, Natalie Imbruglia) – 3:35

Charts

Release history

References

Natalie Imbruglia songs
2007 singles
Songs written by Crispin Hunt
2007 songs
Songs written by Natalie Imbruglia